George Frederic Allen (15 February 1837 – 28 February 1929) was a New Zealand architect, surveyor, teacher and tourist guide. He was born in London,  England on 15 February 1837.

References

1837 births
1929 deaths
New Zealand educators
19th-century New Zealand architects
New Zealand surveyors
English emigrants to New Zealand